The men's  Freestyle Relay event at the 2006 Central American and Caribbean Games occurred on Wednesday, July 19, 2006, at the S.U. Pedro de Heredia Aquatic Complex in Cartagena, Colombia.

Only 8 relays were entered in the event, and consequently, it was only swum once (in finals).

Records at the time of the event were:
World Record: 3:13.17,  South Africa (Schoeman, Ferns, Townsend, Neethling), Athens, Greece, August 15, 2004.
Games Record: 3:23.49,  Venezuela (Quevedo, Paez, Rojas, Sánchez), 1998 Games in Maracaibo (Aug.18.1998).

Results

References

2006 CAC results: Men's 4x100 Free Relay from the website of the 2006 Central American and Caribbean Games; retrieved 2009-07-02.

Freestyle Relay, Men's 4x100m